The Mayer Authority was the second High Authority of the European Coal and Steel Community (ECSC), between 1955 and 1958. Its president was René Mayer of France.

There were three more High Authorities before the institutions of the ECSC were merged with those of the European Atomic Energy Community and the European Economic Community in 1967 to become the European Communities.

Membership
There was a great deal of continuity with the Monnet Authority, in addition to René Mayer of France, as president, the Authority comprised;

Franz Etzel of Germany, First Vice-President (until he resigned on 28 October 1957
External relations

Albert Coppé of Belgium, Second Vice-President
General objectives and long term policy (Chairman)
Markets, agreements, transport (Chairman)
Press and information

Paul Finet of Belgium
Social Problems

Dirk Spierenburg of Netherlands
External relations (Chairman)
Markets, agreements, transport

Léon Daum of France
Finance, investment, production (Chairman)
Instructions group (Chairman)
General objectives and long term policy
Markets, agreements, transport
Press and information

Enzo Giacchero of Italy
Press and information (President)
General objectives and long term policy
Industrial problems, finance
Social problems

Albert Wehrer of Luxembourg
Industrial problems, finance
Social Problems
External relations
Instructions group

References

High Authorities of the European Coal and Steel Community